Nationality words link to articles with information on the nation's poetry or literature (for instance, Irish or France).

Events

1170:
Peire d'Alvernhe probably wrote Chantarai d'aquest trobadors during the summertime at Puivert

1173:
Giraut de Bornelh composed a planh on the death of Raimbaut of Orange

Works published

Approximate date
Serlo of Wilton, "Linquo coax ranis"

Births
Death years link to the corresponding "[year] in poetry" article. There are conflicting or unreliable sources for the birth years of many people born in this period; where sources conflict, the poet is listed again and the conflict is noted:

1170:
 Gaucelm Faidit (died 1202), Occitan troubadour (approx.)
 Hartmann von Aue (died 1210), German poet of the Middle High German period
 Wolfram von Eschenbach (died 1220), German knight and poet; as a Minnesinger, he also wrote lyric poetry
 Pons d'Ortaffa (died 1246), Catalan nobleman and troubadour
 Sighvatr Sturluson (died 1238), skald poet, goði and member of the Icelandic Sturlungar clan
 Walther von der Vogelweide (died 1230), Middle High German lyric poet

1171:
 Fujiwara Toshinari no Musume (died 1253), a Japanese poet (approx.)

1172:
 Shota Rustaveli (died 1216), Georgian poet

1173:
 Huguet de Mataplana (died 1213), troubadour, dies of wounds received in the Battle of Muret
 Kolbeinn Tumason (died 1208), Icelandic skald, composed Heyr himna smiður (Hear, Heavenly Creator)

1175:
 Peire Vidal (died 1205), Occitan troubadour (approx.)
 Henry I of Rodez (died 1221), French troubadour

1176:
 Elazar Rokeach (died 1238), a Talmudist, Cabalist, moralist, scientist and poet

1177:
 Gyōi (died 1217), Japanese poet and Buddhist monk
 Lal Shahbaz Qalander (died 1274), sufi saint, philosopher, poet, and qalandar
 Najmeddin Razi (died 1256), Persian Sufi

1178:
 Snorri Sturluson (died 1241), Icelandic poet

Deaths
Birth years link to the corresponding "[year] in poetry" article:

1170:
 Hywel ab Owain Gwynedd (born unknown), Welsh
 Eliezer ben Nathan (born 1090), in Hebrew

1171:
 Dietmar von Aist (born 1140), an early Minnesänger (possible)
 Rabbeinu Tam (born 1100), Hebrew liturgical poet, in France

1173:
 Raimbaut of Orange (born 1147), Occitan troubadour
 Benoît de Sainte-Maure (born unknown), Anglo-Norman

1178:
 Bernard Silvestris (born 1085), a Latin poet in France (approx.)

See also

 Poetry
 12th century in poetry
 12th century in literature
 List of years in poetry

Other events:
 Other events of the 12th century
 Other events of the 13th century

12th century:
 12th century in poetry
 12th century in literature

Notes

12th-century poetry
Poetry